The Norderelbe (Northern Elbe) is one of the two big anabranches of the Unterelbe river in the area which is now the Port of Hamburg, Germany. The other anabranch is the Süderelbe. Together they form the island of Wilhelmsburg.

See also
List of rivers of Hamburg
List of bridges in Hamburg

Elbe
Rivers of Hamburg
Federal waterways in Germany
0Norderelbe
Rivers of Germany